Iliya Dimitrov (born 10 July 1996) is a Bulgarian footballer who plays as a centre-forward for Oțelul Galați.

Career
Dimitrov made his first team debut in a 4–1 league win over Pirin Gotse Delchev on 3 November 2013, coming on as a substitute for Antonio Vutov.

In January 2017, Dimitrov was loaned to Second League club Lokomotiv Sofia until the end of the season.

Dimitrov returned to Levski Sofia for the 2018-19 season. On 26 February 2019 he signed a new 3 year contract with Levski. 2 days later he was loaned to Septemvri Sofia until the end of the season. He made his debut for the team on 2 March in a league match against CSKA Sofia and scored a goal in the 89th minute for the 5:1 loss.

Career statistics

Club

References

External links
 
 Profile at LevskiSofia.info
 Profile at LokoSf.info

1996 births
Living people
People from Dupnitsa
Bulgarian footballers
Bulgaria youth international footballers
Bulgaria under-21 international footballers
Association football forwards
First Professional Football League (Bulgaria) players
Second Professional Football League (Bulgaria) players
PFC Levski Sofia players
Neftochimic Burgas players
OFC Pirin Blagoevgrad players
FC Lokomotiv 1929 Sofia players
FC Septemvri Sofia players
FC Vitosha Bistritsa players
Sportspeople from Kyustendil Province